Melanie Fiona Hallim (born July 4, 1983) is a Canadian singer and songwriter. She was born and raised in Toronto, Ontario. She began her career in 2002 as part of a Canadian girl group trio, who was nominated for a Juno Award for R&B/Soul Recording of the Year for the group's self-titled album. She went on to be part of The Renaissance (with rapper Drake), and under the name Syren Hall, recorded some reggae songs.

Fiona's debut solo album The Bridge was released in 2009, having collaborated with Future Cut, Vada Nobles, Stereotypes, J. Phoenix and Peter Wade Keusch. Her debut single, "Give It to Me Right", was sent to radio stations on February 28, 2009, and peaked at number 20 on the Canadian Hot 100 chart and number 41 on the UK Singles Chart. The second single, "It Kills Me", became her breakout song on the Billboard Hot 100 where it entered the Top 50, along with topping the Hot R&B/Hip-Hop Songs chart. The song earned Fiona a Grammy Award nomination for Best Female R&B Vocal Performance. The song "Monday Morning" is her biggest hit in Europe to date. The Bridge also earned her a NAACP Image Award nomination for Outstanding New Artist. In 2012, Fiona won two Grammy Awards for Best Traditional R&B Performance and Best R&B Song for the song "Fool for You" with CeeLo Green.

Life and career

1983–2006: Early life and career beginnings

Melanie Fiona Hallim (who goes by Melanie Fiona professionally) was born on July 4, 1983, in Toronto, Ontario, Canada. She is the daughter and second child of Guyanese immigrant parents, who immigrated to Canada in the late 1970s. Her parents are of Afro-Guyanese, Indo-Guyanese, and Portuguese descent.
Her father was a janitor before working in finance, and her mother worked in banking. Fiona began writing songs at age 16. Living in a music-filled household, Fiona says she always knew music was her passion. Her father was a guitarist in a band and would allow her to sit on the stage when she was younger as he would play. In 2002, Fiona was part of a girl group called X-Quisite alongside Nicole Holness and Nirvana Savoury. Signed to Warner Music Canada, the group released their self-titled debut studio album X-Quisite in 2003. At the 2004 Juno Awards, the group was nominated as one of five finalists for R&B/Soul Recording of the Year for the album X-Quisite. The group had a number of singles from the album, notably "Bad Girl" and "No Regrets". The group disbanded in 2005.

She was also in a group called The Renaissance with rapper Drake. Early in her career, she would perform at nightclubs in Toronto. In 2005, Fiona traveled to Los Angeles, in search of a recording contract. According to Fiona, record labels "loved" the way she looked and sung, but she "knew that the minute I worked with them or would have signed with them, they would have tried to change me into someone else completely different. That was something that I didn't want to do." She went on to co-write songs for recording artists Rihanna and Kardinal Offishall, working with, amongst others, super producer Mike City. Fiona also recorded the reggae song "Somebody Come Get Me" under the stage name Syren Hall, which was included in the Reggae Gold 2008 compilation album.

2007–2010: The Bridge

Entrepreneur Steve Rifkind discovered and signed Fiona to SRC Records and Universal Motown through Title 9 Productions in 2007. She went on to tour with Kanye West in his Glow in the Dark Tour Prior to completing her debut album, Fiona met with recording artist Jay-Z and his friend Tyty. She played them some of her music and was then signed to be managed by Roc Nation. She released her debut album, The Bridge, in June 2009, which has sold 248,000 copies in the United States. Beyond Race Magazine ranked Fiona among "50 Emerging Artists" of 2009. Several singles were released from the album, including "It Kills Me", which topped the Billboard Hot R&B/Hip-Hop Songs chart for 10 weeks and earned her a Grammy Award nomination at the 52nd Grammy Awards for Best Female R&B Vocal Performance. Other singles that were released were "Sad Songs" was released in April 2009 in the UK only as a digital download, with the reggae-tinged songs "Somebody Come Get Me" and "Island Boy" as B-sides. "Sad Songs" did not chart in the UK. "Give It to Me Right" was the first official single from The Bridge. The song peaked at #41 in the UK but failed to chart on the Billboard Hot 100 in the US. It did, however, reach #57 on the U.S. Billboard Hot R&B/Hip-Hop Songs chart and at #41.

"Monday Morning" charted in Switzerland and Poland at number 1 and in Austria at number 5. It was released as the third U.S. single, however, "Bang Bang" was sent to radio as the second Canadian single for Canadian top 40 & hot AC play. Due to "Priceless" not being released in Canada, "Monday Morning" will serve as the fifth single in Canada due to hot adult contemporary radio station CKZZ-FM (Virgin Radio 953) in Vancouver having the song on its playlist. "Ay Yo" was released as the fourth official single from The Bridge, according to Fiona's website and Twitter. The music video premiered on April 12, 2010. "Priceless" will be the fifth U.S. single due to airplay on urban adult contemporary stations. Due to "Priceless" not being released in Canada, "Monday Morning" will be released to Canadian stations as the fifth single, even though "Monday Morning" appeared as the third American single.

Fiona participated in "We Are the World 25 for Haiti" to benefit after the 2010 Haiti earthquake. She began touring with Alicia Keys as an opening act on The Freedom Tour in 2010.
The album spawned six singles with one being "It Kills Me" which reached the top spot on US R&B chart. Melanie Fiona was also put on the top 100 charts for her song "it kills me" and "4am". [20]

2011–present: The MF Life and Awake
In 2011, Fiona began recording her second studio album. The lead single was titled "Gone and Never Coming Back." The single peaked at 37 on the US R&B chart becoming her second highest peaking song on the R&B chart so far. Later on that year Fiona released her second single, "4 AM" was sent to urban stations on August 30, 2011. 4am peaked on the US R&B chart at #8, the song was about a lover who had gone out and was cheating on her.
The album was released on March 20, 2012.

On January 2, 2012, she performed "O Canada" at the NHL Winter Classic between the New York Rangers and Philadelphia Flyers at Citizens Bank Park.

A newly independent artist, Fiona is currently working on her third album Awake. She released a single "Cold Piece" in 2013. On May 12, 2015, she premiered a new song and lyric video "Bite the Bullet", set to appear on her new album (2016). "I feel like sometimes people know my songs but haven’t gotten the opportunity to know me" Fiona told the VIBE. "I want to make people feel good and I want people to feel that they are not alone, that this album and me as an artist represent a voice for people to feel like 'Yeah, that is the life we’re living and we’re living it together so let’s do our part to move forward positively, and do some really great things while we are alive here" she added. In September, she announced two more tracks for the album: "I Tried" – the first track written for the album, and "Killing Time" – written when she broke up with her boyfriend. Her album Awake is set for 2016 release.

Personal life
Fiona and songwriter Jared Cotter have a son born on 14 March 2016. They became engaged on 14 February 2018. Originally they planned to marry on Amalfi Coast, Italy; but the COVID-19 pandemic forced them to postpone their wedding three times. The couple married privately on 12 December 2020 in Los Angeles. The couple welcomed a daughter in December 2021.

Artistry

Voice
Fiona is a dramatic soprano. Her voice has been referred to as being both "soulful" and "sassy." Some have praised her vocals for being "very passionate, but clean and controlled, and not over-the-top singing."

Musical style and influences
Fiona cites Mariah Carey, Whitney Houston, Christina Aguilera, Sam Cooke, Sade, Amy Winehouse, India.Arie, Patsy Cline and Bob Marley as her musical influences. Furthermore, she mentioned Brandy as major inspiration, naming her the only artist that had her starstruck next to Prince. She also cited Janet Jackson's career as inspirational, who she called an icon. She called Lauryn Hill's The Miseducation of Lauryn Hill the album that changed her perspective, calling it an "amazing body of work". She attributes her parents for her vintage sound. Her father was a guitarist in a band, while her mother would sing around the house. She explained that "[m]y parents were big music lovers and played soul music all the time", who would play The Supremes, The Ronettes and Cooke, as well as Caribbean music like soca, calypso and reggae.

Fiona's occasional songwriting revolves around her personal experiences. She stated that she attempts to "keep [the songs] as universal as possible, unless I am writing about something very personal, even then the themes are universal". She has received comparisons to Amy Winehouse, Lauryn Hill, Macy Gray, Chrisette Michele, Marsha Ambrosius and Jill Scott.

Discography

 The Bridge (2009)
 The MF Life (2012)

Awards and nominations
BET Awards
The BET Awards were established in 2001 by the BET Networks to celebrate African Americans and other Minority group in music, acting, sports, and other fields of entertainment over the past year.

|-
|rowspan="4"|2010
|rowspan="3"|Melanie Fiona
|Best Female R&B Artist
|
|-
|Best New Artist
|
|-
|BET Centric Award
|
|-
|"It Kills Me"
|Video of the Year
|
|-
|2012
|Melanie Fiona
|Best Female R&B Artist
|
|}

Eska Music Awards
Eska Music Awards is a major Polish awards ceremony for national and international music launched in 2002 by Radio Eska.

|-
|2010
|The Bridge
|Best International Album
|
|}

Grammy Award
A Grammy Award is an honour awarded by the National Academy of Recording Arts and Sciences of the United States to recognize outstanding achievement in the mainly English-language music industry.

|-
|2010
|"It Kills Me"
|Best Female R&B Vocal Performance
|
|-
|2011
|"Wake Up Everybody" (with Common, John Legend & The Roots)
|Best Rap/Sung Collaboration
|
|-
|rowspan="2"|2012
|rowspan="2"|"Fool for You" (with CeeLo Green)
|Best Traditional R&B Performance
|
|-
|Best R&B Song
|
|-
|2013
|"Wrong Side Of A Love Song"
|Best Traditional R&B Performance
|
|}

Juno Award
The Juno Award are presented annually to Canadian musical artists and bands to acknowledge their artistic and technical achievements in all aspects of music.

|-
|2010
|The Bridge
|R&B/Soul Recording of the Year
|
|-
|2012
|Gone and Never Coming Back
|R&B/Soul Recording of the Year
|
|}

NAACP Image Award
An NAACP Image Award is an accolade presented by the American National Association for the Advancement of Colored People to honour outstanding person of color in film, television, music, and literature.

|-
|2010
|Melanie Fiona
|Outstanding New Artist
|
|-
|rowspan="2"| 2012
|Ceelo Green & Melanie Fiona
|Outstanding Duo or Group
|
|-
|"Fool For You" (with CeeLo Green)
|Outstanding Song
|
|}

Soul Train Music Awards
The Soul Train Music Awards is an annual award show which previously aired in national Broadcast syndication, and honours the best in Black music and entertainment.

|-
|2010
|Melanie Fiona
|Best R&B/Soul or Rap New Artist
|
|}

References

External links

 
 

1983 births
Living people
21st-century Black Canadian women singers
Canadian people of Guyanese descent
Canadian people of Indian descent
Canadian people of Portuguese descent
Canadian contemporary R&B singers
Canadian soul singers
Grammy Award winners
Musicians from Toronto
Roc Nation artists
SRC Records artists
Motown artists
Canadian hip hop singers
Canadian women pop singers
Juno Award for R&B/Soul Recording of the Year winners
Canadian women singer-songwriters
Universal Motown Records artists